Jacklyn Sheryl Rosen (née Spektor; born August 2, 1957) is an American politician serving as the junior United States senator from Nevada since 2019. A member of the Democratic Party, she was the U.S. representative for Nevada's 3rd congressional district from 2017 to 2019.

Rosen was elected to the Senate in 2018, defeating Republican incumbent Dean Heller. She was the only House freshman to win a Senate seat in the 2018 midterm elections and the only challenger to defeat a Republican incumbent senator in 2018.

Early life and career
Rosen was born on August 2, 1957, in Chicago, Illinois, to Carol, a homemaker, and Leonard Spektor, a car dealership owner who had served in the U.S. Army during the Korean War. Rosen's mother was of Irish, German, and Austrian descent, and her father's family were Jewish emigrants from Russia and Austria.

Rosen attended the University of Minnesota and graduated with a bachelor's degree in psychology in 1979. While she was in college, her parents moved to Las Vegas, where Rosen moved after graduating. She took a job with Summa Corporation and worked summers as a waitress at Caesars Palace throughout the 1980s. While working for Summa, she attended Clark County Community College (now the College of Southern Nevada) and received an associate degree in computing and information technology in 1985. She began working for Southwest Gas in 1990 before leaving to open her own consulting business three years later.

U.S. House of Representatives

Elections

2016 

A former computer programmer with no political experience at the time, Rosen was asked by U.S. Senate Minority Leader Harry Reid, also from Nevada, to run in the 2016 election for the U.S. House seat being vacated by Republican Joe Heck. Rosen won 60% of the vote in the Democratic primary election and narrowly defeated Republican nominee Danny Tarkanian in the general election. She was sworn into office on January 3, 2017.

Committee assignments
 Committee on Armed Services
Subcommittee on Military Personnel
Subcommittee on Tactical Air and Land Forces
 Committee on Science, Space, and Technology
Subcommittee on Energy
Subcommittee on Research and Technology

Caucus memberships
Congressional Arts Caucus
Congressional Asian Pacific American Caucus
Congressional Caucus for Women's Issues
Problem Solvers Caucus

U.S. Senate

Elections

2018 

Rosen was elected to the U.S. Senate on November 6, 2018, defeating one-term Republican senator Dean Heller to become the junior senator from Nevada. Her candidacy, announced on July 5, 2017, was endorsed by former President Barack Obama and former vice president Joe Biden. During the campaign, Rosen emphasized her support for the Affordable Care Act (Obamacare) and criticized Heller's vote to repeal it in 2017. At the time, Rosen voted in the U.S. House against Republicans' attempts to repeal Obamacare.

Rosen defeated Heller, 50.4%–45.4%. Heller carried 15 of Nevada's 17 county-level jurisdictions, but Rosen carried the state's two largest, Clark (home to Las Vegas) and Washoe (home to Reno). She won Clark County by over 92,000 votes, almost double her statewide margin of more than 48,900 votes.

Rosen was one of only two non-incumbent Democrats, alongside Kyrsten Sinema of Arizona, to win election to the Senate in 2018. She is also the 37th freshman member of the U.S. House to win a Senate seat and the first woman to do so.

Tenure

Rosen was on Capitol Hill for the 2021 United States Electoral College vote count when supporters of President Donald Trump stormed the U.S. Capitol. At the time, she was in the Russell Senate Office Building before being evacuated to a secure, undisclosed location. She tweeted during the attack, calling the event "reprehensible" and writing, "It's time for us as a nation to come together and denounce hate and violence."

Committee assignments
Committee on Commerce, Science, and Transportation
Subcommittee on Aviation and Space
Subcommittee on Communications, Technology, Innovation, and the Internet
Subcommittee on Manufacturing, Trade and Consumer Protection
Subcommittee on Security
Committee on Health, Education, Labor and Pensions
Subcommittee on Employment and Workplace Safety
Subcommittee on Primary Health and Retirement Security
Committee on Homeland Security and Governmental Affairs
Permanent Subcommittee on Investigations
Subcommittee on Regulatory Affairs and Federal Management
Committee on Small Business and Entrepreneurship
Special Committee on Aging

Political positions 
Rosen has been described as a liberal Democrat at times and as a moderate at others. As of April 2020, FiveThirtyEight found that Rosen's votes aligned with President Trump's legislative positions about 36% of the time. The American Conservative Union gave her a 5% lifetime conservative rating in 2020.

Foreign policy 
In April 2019, Rosen was one of 34 senators to sign a letter to Trump encouraging him "to listen to members of your own Administration and reverse a decision that will damage our national security and aggravate conditions inside Central America." The letter asserted that Trump had "consistently expressed a flawed understanding of U.S. foreign assistance" since becoming president and that he was "personally undermining efforts to promote U.S. national security and economic prosperity" through preventing the use of Fiscal Year 2018 national security funding. The senators argued that foreign assistance to Central American countries created less migration to the U.S. by helping to improve conditions in those countries.

Gun policy
Rosen supports an assault weapons ban.

Health care
Rosen supports the Affordable Care Act and its provisions that prevent patients from being denied insurance or charged more due to age or a preexisting condition. She supports allowing citizens to buy into Medicaid as an alternative option that would compete with private insurance companies.

In January 2019, during the 2018-2019 government shutdown, Rosen was one of 34 senators to sign a letter to Commissioner of Food and Drugs Scott Gottlieb recognizing the FDA's efforts to address the effect of the shutdown on the public health and employees while remaining alarmed "that the continued shutdown will result in increasingly harmful effects on the agency's employees and the safety and security of the nation's food and medical products."

In February 2019, Rosen was one of 11 senators to sign a letter to insulin manufactures Eli Lilly and Company, Novo Nordisk, and Sanofi over increased insulin prices, saying the increases kept patients from receiving "access to the life-saving medications they need."

In August 2019, Rosen was one of 19 senators to sign a letter to United States Secretary of the Treasury Steve Mnuchin and United States Secretary of Health and Human Services Alex Azar requesting data from the Trump administration in order to help states and Congress understand the potential consequences if the Texas v. United States Affordable Care Act lawsuit prevailed in courts. They wrote that an overhaul of the present health care system would form "an enormous hole in the pocketbooks of the people we serve as well as wreck state budgets".

Housing 
In April 2019, Rosen was one of 41 senators to sign a bipartisan letter to the housing subcommittee praising the United States Department of Housing and Urban Development's Section 4 Capacity Building program as authorizing "HUD to partner with national nonprofit community development organizations to provide education, training, and financial support to local community development corporations (CDCs) across the country" and expressing disappointment that Trump's budget "has slated this program for elimination after decades of successful economic and community development." The senators wrote of their hope that the subcommittee would support continued funding for Section 4 in Fiscal Year 2020.

Immigration
Rosen supports "comprehensive immigration reform" but does not believe the Immigration and Customs Enforcement agency should be abolished.

Jobs and economy
In 2018, Rosen was one of three U.S. House Democrats to break with their party and vote to make individual tax cuts permanent. She supports a $15 hourly minimum wage.

Women
Rosen is pro-choice and has been endorsed by NARAL Pro-Choice America.

Personal life
Rosen resides in Henderson, Nevada, with her husband, Larry, a radiologist. They have a daughter. Before entering politics, she served as the president of the Congregation Ner Tamid synagogue, a Reform Jewish synagogue in Henderson. She has cited the philosophy of tikkun olam as a key part of her decision to enter politics.

Electoral history

2016 

Source:

Source:

2018 

Source:

Source:

See also 

List of Jewish members of the United States Congress
Women in the United States House of Representatives
Women in the United States Senate

References

External links 

 Official U.S. Senate website
 Jacky Rosen for U.S. Senate official campaign website

 

|-

|-

|-

1957 births
21st-century American politicians
21st-century American women politicians
American computer programmers
American consultants
American people of Austrian-Jewish descent
American people of German descent
American people of Irish descent
American people of Russian-Jewish descent
American Reform Jews
College of Southern Nevada alumni
Democratic Party members of the United States House of Representatives from Nevada
Democratic Party United States senators from Nevada
Female members of the United States House of Representatives
Female United States senators
Jewish members of the United States House of Representatives
Jewish United States senators
Jewish women politicians
Living people
Politicians from Chicago
Politicians from Las Vegas
University of Minnesota College of Liberal Arts alumni
Women in Nevada politics
American gun control activists
21st-century American Jews